Atomus or Atomos was a Jewish Cypriot magician who appears in the Antiquities of the Jews by Josephus, working for Felix at Caesarea.

Atomus is described as having been employed by Felix to convince Herod Agrippa II's sister Drusilla to divorce Azizus of Emesa and marry him instead. 

The text reads "Simon" in some Latin manuscripts and Hans Waitz (1904) suggested that the magi may have been identifiable as Simon Magus. This is not generally accepted as Atomus was a Jew and Simon Magus was a Samaritan.

References 

Magic (supernatural)
Occultists
1st-century Jews
Ancient Cypriots